Gwangheungchang Station is a subway station on the Seoul Subway Line 6 in Mapo-gu, Seoul. It is located close to the northern end of Seogang Bridge, which links Sinchon and Yeouido. Bamseom, located under the bridge on the Han River, is visible from here.

Station layout

Gallery

References 

Railway stations opened in 2000
Metro stations in Mapo District